Stella Chung (born 9 July 1981) is a Malaysian actress and singer.

Career
Stella started her entertainment career by making her debut . She then signed  in 2006 and released her first studio album in 2007. She has also starred in a number of Singaporean–Malaysian-co-produced Chinese dramas.

Personal life
Chung was born in Sarawak and spent her schooling years in Sarikei. Her older brother, Nick Chung, is also a singer.

Filmography

Television

Film

Discography

References

External links
 

Living people
1981 births
Malaysian actresses
21st-century Malaysian women singers
People from Sarawak
Malaysian people of Hakka descent
Hakka musicians